Sir George Fenwick Smith  (24 June 1914 – 21 November 1978) was a Scottish trade unionist.

Smith was born in Arbroath, Angus, and educated at Inverbrothock and Downfield Schools. He worked as a carpenter and joined the Amalgamated Society of Woodworkers in 1933.  He also joined the Communist Party of Great Britain in the early 1940s but left it in 1954.

Smith became the full-time National Organiser of the Woodworkers in 1945, and then Assistant General Secretary in 1949. Ten years later, he was elected as the union's General Secretary. When the Woodworkers merged with other unions to form the Union of Construction, Allied Trades and Technicians, Smith became its first General Secretary, serving until his death in 1978. He also serve as the President of the Trades Union Congress in 1972, and on the council of Acas from 1974.

He was appointed a Commander of the Order of the British Empire in 1969 and knighted in the 1978 New Year Honours.

He died in Sutton, London, in 1978.

References

1914 births
1978 deaths
People from Arbroath
Scottish carpenters
Commanders of the Order of the British Empire
Communist Party of Great Britain members
Knights Bachelor
General Secretaries of the Amalgamated Society of Woodworkers
General secretaries of the Union of Construction, Allied Trades and Technicians
Presidents of the Trades Union Congress
Scottish trade unionists